Anthony S. Caprio  was the former president of Western New England University and a French language scholar. He was the fifth President of Western New England University, succeeding Dr. Beverly Miller. He was succeeded in 2020 by Robert Johnson.

Dr. Caprio is a member of Omicron Delta Kappa, Phi Beta Kappa, and the law school accreditation committee of the American Bar Association.

Selection as president

Dr. Caprio was selected by a unanimous vote of the Board of Trustees in June 1996, after a seven-month national search. He began his tenure as President on September 1, 1996.

Biography

Dr. Caprio received the B.A. degree in 1967 from Wesleyan University, where he was named to Phi Beta Kappa, the M.A. from Columbia University in 1969, and the Ph.D. from Columbia University in 1973. He undertook his studies also in Paris. He was awarded the honorary bachelor's degree from Western New England University in 2000.

Since 1973, he has worked as a teacher and administrator in a wide range of institutions, both private and public. Prior to his appointment as President of Western New England University, Dr. Caprio served for seven years as provost and professor of language and literature at Oglethorpe University in Atlanta where he was responsible as chief academic officer for all matters related to faculty and to undergraduate and graduate curriculum. Dr. Caprio led the development of the University's strategic plan and its subsequent implementation, including the innovative integration of the institution's liberal arts curriculum within its urban setting. His efforts with regard to internationalization of the University resulted in numerous exchange agreements with universities in Europe, Japan, and South America.

Before joining Oglethorpe University, President Caprio held administrative and faculty positions at several institutions. From 1980-1989, he was professor and administrator at American University in Washington, D.C. where he was responsible for faculty and staff in languages and literatures, area and foreign studies, linguistics, and English as a second language. He helped establish study abroad centers in Poland and in Argentina with the American University World Capitals Program, held academic program oversight of American University in Rome, and developed interdisciplinary undergraduate and graduate programs with other units of the University. At American University he was recognized with the Administrator-Faculty Award for Outstanding Performance. Prior to American University, he served at Cedar Crest College in Pennsylvania and Lehman College of the City University of New York.

Listed in Who's Who in America, Who's Who in the World, Who's Who in the East, and Who's Who in American Education, Dr. Caprio is a noted language scholar who has published two books in the areas of language and literature, including Reflets de la Femme (1973), and the once widely used college text French for Communication (1985). These books are no longer in print.

President Caprio is a frequent speaker on diverse aspects of higher education at regional, national, and international conferences, as well as at numerous colleges and universities in the United States and abroad. He is a frequent consultant and evaluator for numerous colleges, universities, and national educational organizations.

Accomplishments and Challenges 
Caprio has presided over an era change and growth at Western New England University. Several major building projects (Commonwealth Hall, LaRiviere Hall, the S. Prestley Blake Law Center expansion, Golden Bear Stadium, the St. Germain Campus Center renovation, the Kevin S. Delbridge Welcome Center, the George E. Trelease Memorial Baseball Park, Southwood Hall, and the Center for the Sciences and Pharmacy, and the new Dining Hall) have  been completed on his watch. Many of these projects were made possible through the Transformations: The Campaign for Western New England College. This $20 million effort was conducted entirely during Dr. Caprio's tenure, with honorable assistance from the Board of Trustees. The Campaign raised over $23 million for the University, exceeding the initial goal by over $3 million.

President Caprio has spearheaded the creation of the Western New England University College of Pharmacy, the first new College at the University in 41 years. Complementing the College of Pharmacy is a new Center for the Science and Pharmacy. This , $40 million addition to campus houses the administrative functions of the College of Pharmacy, and state-of-the-art classrooms and laboratories supporting the College of Pharmacy and all science programs at the University. It was the largest building project in the history of the University.

Enrollment and academic qualifications of new students have also increased dramatically during Caprio's administration. The University has delivered its signature quality to a larger undergraduate student body during his time as president. Full-time undergraduate enrollment was 2,456 students for the 2007-08 academic year, a 19.2 percent increase since the 2001-02 academic year. Additionally, the School of Law saw a 29.4 percent increase in total enrollment in the same period.

Student indebtedness is one of the many challenges facing chief executives in higher education. Caprio has stated that reversing a trend of graduate indebtedness will be accomplished by increasing the financial aid pool.  Comparable to most institutions, tuition and fees have increased since Caprio arrived in 1996. However, the proportion of student tuition and fees discounted through grant aid has increased significantly as well.  Caprio's Transformations includes a goal of increasing the financial aid endowment as part of continuing efforts to reduce student indebtedness.  The campaign is providing for 79 scholarships.

References

External links
 Official Biography
 Western New England University website

Living people
Wesleyan University alumni
Western New England University
Columbia University alumni
Lehman College faculty
Cedar Crest College faculty
Year of birth missing (living people)